Gary C. Sherzan (born May 16, 1944) is an American politician in the state of Iowa.

Sherzan was born in Mobile, Alabama. He attended Drake University and was a parole officer. A Democrat, he served in the Iowa House of Representatives from 1983 to 1993 (86th district). His brother Richard Sherzan also served in the Iowa House, from 1979 to 1981.

References

1944 births
Living people
Politicians from Mobile, Alabama
Drake University alumni
Democratic Party members of the Iowa House of Representatives